James or Jim Simon may refer to:

 James Simon (composer) (1880–1944), German composer, pianist and musicologist
 James Simon (journalist), journalism professor at Fairfield University, Fairfield, Connecticut
 James D. Simon (1897–1982), Louisiana politician and jurist
 James Simon (sculptor), American sculptor and mosaic artist
James Simon (art collector), German entrepreneur, art collector, philanthropist and arts patron
 James Simon Gallery, in Berlin
 James Simon (1858–1925), businessman in Brenham, Texas
 Jim Simon (American football)
 Jim Simon (artist)

See also

James Simons (disambiguation)
Simon James (disambiguation)